The Central Leading Group for Inspection Work is a coordination body set up under the Central Committee of the Chinese Communist Party for the purpose of managing party disciplinary inspections nationwide.

Inspection work began in the early 1990s and was a collaboration between the Organization Department and the Central Commission for Discipline Inspection, the party's anti-graft body. The decision to formally establish the leading group was announced in November 2009 by the Central Committee of the Chinese Communist Party.

The group gained special prominence since 2013 under the leadership of Wang Qishan as a result of the wide-reaching anti-corruption campaign following the 18th Party Congress. The Leading Group and its General Office is tasked with dispatching "inspection teams" (xunshizu, 巡视组) to the provinces, central government organs such as ministries, and state-owned enterprises.

Under Wang Qishan, inspection teams have been sent out in several 'rounds', with each round numbering about a dozen inspection teams who 'embed' themselves as part of a regional or central organization for weeks to conduct inspection work on party disciplinary enforcement. Several prominent cases, such as that of Hubei Vice-Governor Guo Youming, Inner Mongolia politician Wang Suyi, Guangzhou Party Secretary Wan Qingliang, and a whole host of officials from Shanxi province, were initiated by the central inspection teams.

Membership

19th Central Committee 
Leader
Zhao Leji, Politburo Standing Committee, Secretary of the Central Commission for Discipline Inspection

18th Central Committee 
Leader
Wang Qishan, Politburo Standing Committee, Secretary of the Central Commission for Discipline Inspection
Deputy Leaders
Zhao Leji, Politburo, head of the Organization Department of the Chinese Communist Party
Zhao Hongzhu, Secretary of the Central Secretariat, Deputy Secretary of the Central Commission for Discipline Inspection
Chief of General Office
Wang Hongjin
Members
Cui Shaopeng, Secretary-General of the Central Commission for Discipline Inspection
Huang Shuxian, Minister of Supervision
Chen Xi, deputy head of the Organization Department
Zhang Jun, Deputy Secretary of the Central Commission for Discipline Inspection
Wang Ersheng, deputy head of the Organization Department
Li Xiaohong
Zhou Zuyi, member of the Organization Department

References 

Institutions of the Central Committee of the Chinese Communist Party
Leading groups of the Chinese Communist Party
2009 establishments in China
Central Commission for Discipline Inspection